Flavisolibacter rigui is a Gram-negative, aerobic, rod-shaped and non-motile bacterium from the genus of Flavisolibacter which has been isolated from freshwater from the Juam Reservoir in Korea.

References

Chitinophagia
Bacteria described in 2014